C. Bernice Wood (October 12, 1895 – July 1, 1933) was an American Negro league pitcher in the 1910s.

A native of Macon, Missouri, Wood played for the Chicago American Giants in 1916. He died in Riverside, California in 1933 at age 37.

References

External links
Baseball statistics and player information from Baseball-Reference Black Baseball Stats and Seamheads

1895 births
1933 deaths
Chicago American Giants players
Baseball pitchers
Baseball players from Missouri
People from Macon, Missouri